Ulmens Auftrag is a German television series that utilized new color-enchancing "accuchrome" technology.

See also
List of German television series

External links
 

2004 German television series debuts
2006 German television series endings
German comedy television series
German-language television shows